Rusty Guilbeau (born November 20, 1958) is a former American football linebacker. He played for the New York Jets from 1982 to 1986 and for the Cleveland Browns in 1987.

References

1958 births
Living people
American football linebackers
McNeese Cowboys football players
New York Jets players
Cleveland Browns players